Kong Srim is a Cambodian judge and the president of the Khmer Rouge Tribunal.

His past positions include:
Deputy President of the Supreme Court of the Kingdom of Cambodia
Deputy General Prosecutor of the Office of the General Prosecutor attached to the Court of Appeal
Deputy Chief of the Prosecution Office, Department of Criminal and Civil Affairs of the Ministry of Justice
Officer of the Ministry of Justice.

References 

Cambodian judges
Living people
Year of birth missing (living people)
Khmer Rouge Tribunal judges